Xylocoris flavipes, the warehouse pirate bug, is a species of bugs in the family Lyctocoridae. It is found in Africa, Australia, Europe and Northern Asia (excluding China), North America, South America, and Southern Asia.

References

Further reading

 

Lyctocoridae
Articles created by Qbugbot
Insects described in 1875